The United Nations Convention to Combat Desertification in Those Countries Experiencing Serious Drought and/or Desertification, Particularly in Africa (UNCCD) is a Convention to combat desertification and mitigate the effects of drought through national action programs that incorporate long-term strategies supported by international cooperation and partnership arrangements.

The Convention, the only convention stemming from a direct recommendation of the Rio Conference's Agenda 21, was adopted in Paris, France, on 17 June 1994 and entered into force in December 1996. It is the only internationally legally binding framework set up to address the problem of desertification. The Convention is based on the principles of participation, partnership and decentralization—the backbone of good governance and sustainable development. It has 197 parties, making it near universal in reach.

To help publicise the Convention, 2006 was declared "International Year of Deserts and Desertification" but debates have ensued regarding how effective the International Year was in practice.

Ibrahim Thiaw was appointed as Under Secretary General of the United Nations and UNCCD Executive Secretary on 31 January 2019.

States Parties 

The UNCCD has been ratified by the European Union and 196 states: all 193 UN member states, the Cook Islands, Niue, and the State of Palestine.

On 28 March 2013, Canada became the first country to withdraw from the convention. However, three years later, Canada reversed its withdrawal by re-acceding to the convention on 21 December 2016, which resulted in Canada becoming party to the convention again on 21 March 2017.

The Holy See (Vatican City) is the only state that is not a party to the convention that is eligible to accede to it.

Secretariat
The permanent Secretariat of the UNCCD was established during the first Conference of the parties (COP 1) held in Rome in 1997. It has been located in Bonn, Germany, since January 1999, and moved from its first Bonn address in Haus Carstanjen to the new UN Campus in July 2006.

The functions of the secretariat are to make arrangements for sessions of the Conference of the Parties (COP) and its subsidiary bodies established under the Convention, and to provide them with services as required. One key task of the secretariat is to compile and transmit reports submitted to it.

The secretariat also provides assistance to affected developing country Parties, particularly those in Africa. This is important when compiling information and reports required under the Convention. UNCCD activities are coordinated with the secretariats of other relevant international bodies and conventions, like those of the UN Framework Convention on Climate Change (UNFCCC) and the Convention on Biological Diversity (CBD).

Conference of the Parties
The Conference of the Parties (COP) oversees the implementation of the Convention. It is established by the Convention as the supreme decision-making body, and it comprises all ratifying governments. The first five sessions of the COP were held annually from 1997 to 2001.

Starting 2001 sessions are held on a biennial basis interchanging with the sessions of the Committee for the Review of the Implementation of the Convention (CRIC), whose first session was held in 2002.

List of COP

Committee on Science and Technology 
The UN Convention to Combat Desertification has established a Committee on Science and Technology (CST). The CST was established under Article 24 of the Convention as a subsidiary body of the COP, and its mandate and terms of reference were defined and adopted during the first session of the Conference of the Parties in 1997. It is composed of government representatives competent in the fields of expertise relevant to combating desertification and mitigating the effects of drought. The committee identifies priorities for research, and recommends ways of strengthening cooperation among researchers. It is multi-disciplinary and open to the participation of all Parties. It meets in conjunction with the ordinary sessions of the COP.

The CST collects, analyses and reviews relevant data. It also promotes cooperation in the field of combating desertification and mitigating the effects of drought through appropriate sub-regional, regional and national institutions, and in particular by its activities in research and development, which contribute to increased knowledge of the processes leading to desertification and drought as well as their impact.

The Bureau of the CST is composed of the Chairperson and the four Vice-Chairpersons. The chairman is elected by the Conference of the Parties at each of its sessions with due regard to ensure geographical distribution and adequate representation of affected Country Parties, particularly those in Africa, who shall not serve for more than two consecutive terms. The Bureau of the CST is responsible for the follow-up of the work of the Committee between sessions of the COP and may benefit from the assistance of ad hoc panels established by the COP.

The CST also contributes to distinguishing causal factors, both natural and human, with a view to combating desertification and achieving improved productivity as well as the sustainable use and management of resources.

Under the authority of the CST, a Group of Experts was established by the COP with a specific work programme, to assist in improving the efficiency and effectiveness of the CST. This Group of Experts, working under the authority of the CST, provides advice on the areas of drought and desertification.

Group of Experts 
The Group of Experts (GoE) plays an important institutional role, providing the CST with information on the current knowledge, the extent and the impact, the possible scenarios and the policy implications on various themes assigned in its work programme. The results of the work performed by the GoE are widely recognized and include dissemination of its results on ongoing activities (benchmarks and indicators, traditional knowledge, early warning systems).

The Group of Experts develops and makes available to all interested people information on appropriate mechanisms for scientific and technological cooperation and articulates research projects, which promote awareness about desertification and drought between countries and stakeholders at the international, regional and national level.

The Group of Experts seeks to build on and use existing work and evidence to produce pertinent synthesis and outputs for the use of the Parties to the Convention and for the broader dissemination to the scientific community. The programme of work and its mandate is pluri-annual in nature, for a maximum of four years.

National, regional and sub-regional programmes 
National Action Programmes (NAP) are one of the key instruments in the implementation of the Convention. They are strengthened by Action Programmes on Sub-regional (SRAP) and Regional (RAP) level. National Action Programmes are developed in the framework of a participative approach involving the local communities and they spell out the practical steps and measures to be taken to combat desertification in specific ecosystems.

See also 

 Action for Climate Empowerment
 Earth Summit
 Economics of Land Degradation Initiative
 Hama Arba Diallo
 International Year of Deserts and Desertification
 List of international environmental agreements
 Terrafrica partnership
 United Nations Framework Convention on Climate Change (UNFCCC)
 World Day to Combat Desertification and Drought

References 

Full text available from UNCCD.int
 Rechkemmer, Andreas (2004): Postmodern Global Governance. The United Nations Convention to Combat Desertification. Baden-Baden: Nomos Verlag.

External links 

 
 2006: International Year of Deserts and Desertification
 The Economics of Land Degradation Initiative - Homepage
 UNESCO Water Portal: UNCCD

Environmental treaties
United Nations Convention to Combat Desertification
United Nations Convention to Combat Desertification
United Nations Convention to Combat Desertification
United Nations treaties
United Nations Convention to Combat Desertification
United Nations Convention to Combat Desertification
Treaties of the Islamic State of Afghanistan
Treaties of Albania
Treaties of Algeria
Treaties of Angola
Treaties of Antigua and Barbuda
Treaties of Argentina
Treaties of Armenia
Treaties of Australia
Treaties of Austria
Treaties of Azerbaijan
Treaties of the Bahamas
Treaties of Bahrain
Treaties of Bangladesh
Treaties of Barbados
Treaties of Belarus
Treaties of Belgium
Treaties of Belize
Treaties of Benin
Treaties of Bhutan
Treaties of Bolivia
Treaties of Bosnia and Herzegovina
Treaties of Botswana
Treaties of Brazil
Treaties of Brunei
Treaties of Bulgaria
Treaties of Burkina Faso
Treaties of Burundi
Treaties of Cambodia
Treaties of Cameroon
Treaties of Canada
Treaties of Cape Verde
Treaties of the Central African Republic
Treaties of Chad
Treaties of Chile
Treaties of the People's Republic of China
Treaties of Colombia
Treaties of the Comoros
Treaties of the Republic of the Congo
Treaties of the Cook Islands
Treaties of Costa Rica
Treaties of Ivory Coast
Treaties of Croatia
Treaties of Cuba
Treaties of Cyprus
Treaties of the Czech Republic
Treaties of North Korea
Treaties of the Democratic Republic of the Congo
Treaties of Denmark
Treaties of Djibouti
Treaties of Dominica
Treaties of the Dominican Republic
Treaties of Ecuador
Treaties of Egypt
Treaties of El Salvador
Treaties of Equatorial Guinea
Treaties of Eritrea
Treaties of Estonia
Treaties of Ethiopia
Treaties of Fiji
Treaties of Finland
Treaties of France
Treaties of Gabon
Treaties of the Gambia
Treaties of Georgia (country)
Treaties of Germany
Treaties of Ghana
Treaties of Greece
Treaties of Grenada
Treaties of Guatemala
Treaties of Guinea
Treaties of Guinea-Bissau
Treaties of Guyana
Treaties of Haiti
Treaties of Honduras
Treaties of Hungary
Treaties of Iceland
Treaties of India
Treaties of Indonesia
Treaties of Iran
Treaties of Iraq
Treaties of Ireland
Treaties of Israel
Treaties of Italy
Treaties of Jamaica
Treaties of Japan
Treaties of Jordan
Treaties of Kazakhstan
Treaties of Kenya
Treaties of Kiribati
Treaties of Kuwait
Treaties of Kyrgyzstan
Treaties of Laos
Treaties of Latvia
Treaties of Lebanon
Treaties of Lesotho
Treaties of Liberia
Treaties of the Libyan Arab Jamahiriya
Treaties of Liechtenstein
Treaties of Lithuania
Treaties of Luxembourg
Treaties of Madagascar
Treaties of Malawi
Treaties of Malaysia
Treaties of the Maldives
Treaties of Mali
Treaties of Malta
Treaties of the Marshall Islands
Treaties of Mauritania
Treaties of Mauritius
Treaties of Mexico
Treaties of the Federated States of Micronesia
Treaties of Monaco
Treaties of Mongolia
Treaties of Montenegro
Treaties of Morocco
Treaties of Mozambique
Treaties of Myanmar
Treaties of Namibia
Treaties of Nauru
Treaties of Nepal
Treaties of the Netherlands
Treaties of New Zealand
Treaties of Nicaragua
Treaties of Niger
Treaties of Nigeria
Treaties of Niue
Treaties of Norway
Treaties of Oman
Treaties of Pakistan
Treaties of Palau
Treaties of Panama
Treaties of Papua New Guinea
Treaties of Paraguay
Treaties of Peru
Treaties of the Philippines
Treaties of Poland
Treaties of Portugal
Treaties of Qatar
Treaties of South Korea
Treaties of Moldova
Treaties of Romania
Treaties of Russia
Treaties of Rwanda
Treaties of Samoa
Treaties of San Marino
Treaties of São Tomé and Príncipe
Treaties of Saudi Arabia
Treaties of Senegal
Treaties of Serbia
Treaties of Seychelles
Treaties of Sierra Leone
Treaties of Singapore
Treaties of Slovakia
Treaties of Slovenia
Treaties of the Solomon Islands
Treaties of the Transitional National Government of Somalia
Treaties of South Africa
Treaties of Spain
Treaties of Sri Lanka
Treaties of Saint Kitts and Nevis
Treaties of Saint Lucia
Treaties of Saint Vincent and the Grenadines
Treaties of South Sudan
Treaties of the Republic of the Sudan (1985–2011)
Treaties of Suriname
Treaties of Eswatini
Treaties of Sweden
Treaties of Switzerland
Treaties of Syria
Treaties of Tajikistan
Treaties of Thailand
Treaties of North Macedonia
Treaties of East Timor
Treaties of Togo
Treaties of Tonga
Treaties of Trinidad and Tobago
Treaties of Tunisia
Treaties of Turkey
Treaties of Turkmenistan
Treaties of Tuvalu
Treaties of Uganda
Treaties of Ukraine
Treaties of the United Arab Emirates
Treaties of the United Kingdom
Treaties of Tanzania
Treaties of Uruguay
Treaties of Uzbekistan
Treaties of Vanuatu
Treaties of Venezuela
Treaties of Vietnam
Treaties of Yemen
Treaties of Zambia
Treaties of Zimbabwe
Treaties entered into by the European Union
United Nations Convention to Combat Desertification
Treaties extended to the British Virgin Islands
Treaties extended to Saint Helena, Ascension and Tristan da Cunha
Treaties extended to Montserrat
Treaties extended to the Faroe Islands
Treaties extended to Greenland
Treaties of the State of Palestine